Meotipa is a genus of comb-footed spiders that was first described by Eugène Louis Simon in 1895.

Species
 it contains eighteen species, found in Asia, Papua New Guinea, and on the Pacific Islands:
Meotipa andamanensis (Tikader, 1977) – India (Andaman Is.)
Meotipa argyrodiformis (Yaginuma, 1952) – China, Japan, Philippines, India
Meotipa bituberculata Deeleman-Reinhold, 2009 – Indonesia (Sumatra, Java)
Meotipa capacifaba Li, Liu, Xu & Yin, 2020 – China
Meotipa impatiens Deeleman-Reinhold, 2009 – Malaysia, Indonesia (Sumatra, Borneo)
Meotipa luoqiae Lin & Li, 2021 – China
Meotipa makiling (Barrion-Dupo & Barrion, 2015) – Philippines
Meotipa menglun Lin & Li, 2021 – China
Meotipa multuma Murthappa, Malamel, Prajapati, Sebastian & Venkateshwarlu, 2017 – India
Meotipa pallida Deeleman-Reinhold, 2009 – Indonesia (Sumatra, Borneo)
Meotipa picturata Simon, 1895 (type) – India, Thailand, Laos, Indonesia
Meotipa pulcherrima (Mello-Leitão, 1917) – Tropical Africa. Introduced to the Americas, Papua New Guinea, China, Korea, Japan, Pacific Is.
Meotipa sahyadri Kulkarni, Vartak, Deshpande & Halali, 2017 – India
Meotipa spiniventris (O. Pickard-Cambridge, 1869) – Sri Lanka to Taiwan, China, Japan. Introduced to the Netherlands
Meotipa thalerorum Deeleman-Reinhold, 2009 – Malaysia, Indonesia (Sumatra, Java)
Meotipa ultapani Basumatary & Brahma, 2019 – India
Meotipa vesiculosa Simon, 1895 – China, Vietnam to Japan, Philippines, Indonesia
Meotipa zhengguoi Lin & Li, 2021 – China

In synonymy:
M. clementinae (Petrunkevitch, 1930) = Meotipa pulcherrima (Mello-Leitão, 1917)
M. jianglensis (Zhu & Song, 1993) = Meotipa vesiculosa Simon, 1895
M. mussau Chrysanthus, 1975 = Meotipa pulcherrima (Mello-Leitão, 1917)

See also
 List of Theridiidae species

References

Araneomorphae genera
Spiders of Asia
Theridiidae